Janusz Marian Majewski (born 5 August 1931) is a Polish film director and screenwriter.

Partial filmography
Majewski has directed more than 40 films since 1957.
1962: Szpital (Awarded at the Tours Film Festival, 1963)
1966: Sublokator (Winner of the FIPRESCI Prize at the International Filmfestival Mannheim-Heidelberg)
1970: Lokis (Winner of the Grand Prix at the 14th International Festival of Science Fiction and Horror Films, Sitges, Spain.)
1972: System (Award for Best Short Film at the 1972 Catalonian International Film Festival) 
1975: Zaklęte rewiry (Entered into the 26th Berlin International Film Festival)
1986: C.K. Dezerterzy
1998: Złoto dezerterów
2010: Mala matura 1947 (Winner of the Special Jury Prize at the Polish Film Festival)
2015: Excentrycy, czyli po slonecznej stronie ulicy (Winner of the Silver Lion for Best Feature Film at the Polish Film Festival)

References

External links

Janusz Majewski at Culture.pl

1931 births
Living people
Polish film directors
Polish screenwriters
Film people from Lviv
Łódź Film School alumni